Park Ji-Yong (born 28 May 1983) is a South Korean footballer.

He was arrested in just 1 year half on the charge connected with the match fixing allegations on 7 July 2011.

External links

1983 births
Living people
South Korean footballers
Sportspeople from Daejeon
Association football defenders
Jeonnam Dragons players
Korean Police FC (Semi-professional) players
Gangwon FC players
K League 1 players